The International League Manager of the Year Award is an annual award given to the best manager in Minor League Baseball's International League based on their regular-season performance as voted on by league managers. Broadcasters, Minor League Baseball executives, members of the media, coaches, and other representatives from the league's clubs have previously voted as well. Though the circuit was founded in 1884, it did not become known as the International League on a consistent basis until 1912. The first Manager of the Year Award was not issued until 1967. After the cancellation of the 2020 season, the league was known as the  East in 2021 before reverting to the International League name in 2022.

The only managers to win the award on three occasions are Joe Altobelli, who won in 1971, 1976, and 1980, and Rick Sweet, the winner in 2008, 2009, and 2022. Seven others have each won twice: Buddy Bailey, Eddie Haas, Dave Miley, Charlie Montoyo, Joe Morgan, Al Pedrique, and Jack Tighe. Tighe (1967 and 1968), Altobelli (1976 and 1977), Haas (1981 and 1982), Pedrique (2016 and 2017), and Sweet (2008 and 2009) won the award in consecutive years.

Seven managers from the Pawtucket Red Sox and Scranton/Wilkes-Barre RailRiders have each been selected for the Manager of the Year Award, more than any other teams in the league, followed by the Rochester Red Wings (6); the Norfolk Tides and Syracuse Mets (5); the Buffalo Bisons (4); the Charleston Charlies, Durham Bulls, Richmond Braves, and Toledo Mud Hens (3); the Columbus Clippers and Louisville Bats (2); and the Charlotte Knights, Gwinnett Stripers, Lehigh Valley IronPigs, Memphis Blues, Nashville Sounds, and Ottawa Lynx (1).

Seven managers from the Baltimore Orioles and Boston Red Sox Major League Baseball (MLB) organizations have each won the award, more than any others, followed by the New York Yankees organization (6); Cleveland Guardians and Philadelphia Phillies organizations (5); the Atlanta Braves, New York Mets, and Toronto Blue Jays organizations (4); the Detroit Tigers, Tampa Bay Rays, and Washington Nationals organizations (3); the Cincinnati Reds organization (2); and the Chicago White Sox, Houston Astros, Milwaukee Brewers, and Pittsburgh Pirates organizations (1).

Winners

Wins by team

Active International League teams appear in bold.

Wins by organization

Active International League–Major League Baseball affiliations appear in bold.

Notes

References
Specific

General

Awards established in 1967
Manager of the Year Award
Minor league baseball coaching awards